The 18th Online Film Critics Society, honoring the best in film for 2014, were announced on December 8, 2014. The winners were announced on December 15, 2014.

Nominees

References 

2014 film awards
2014